Journey to a Mother's Room is a 2018 Spanish-French drama film written and directed by , starring Lola Dueñas and Anna Castillo.

The film was nominated for four Goya Awards. At the 6th Feroz Awards, the film won Best Supporting Actress for Castillo from a total of four nominations.

Cast

Production 
The film was produced by Amorós Producciones and Arcadia Motion Pictures alongside Pecado Films, Sisifo Films and Noodles Production, and it had the participation of RTVE, Canal Sur and Movistar+.

Reception
Journey to a Mother's Room received positive reviews from film critics.

Awards

References

External links
 
 

2018 films
2010s Spanish-language films
2018 drama films
Spanish drama films
French drama films
Arcadia Motion Pictures films
Spanish-language French films
2010s Spanish films
2010s French films
Pecado Films films